The 2021–22 Polish Cup was the 65th edition of the Polish Volleyball Cup tournament.

ZAKSA Kędzierzyn-Koźle beat Jastrzębski Węgiel in the final (3–0) and won its ninth Polish Cup.

Final four
 Venue: Hala Orbita, Wrocław 
 All times are Central European Time (UTC+01:00).

Semifinals
|}

Final

|}

Final standings

Squads

See also
 2021–22 PlusLiga

References

External links
 Official website 

Polish Cup
Polish Cup
Polish Cup
Polish Cup